The physiographic regions of the contiguous United States comprise 8 regions, 25 provinces, and 85 sections. The system dates to Nevin Fenneman's paper Physiographic Subdivision of the United States, published in 1917. Fenneman expanded and presented his system more fully in two books, Physiography of western United States (1931), and Physiography of eastern United States (1938). In these works Fenneman described 25 provinces and 85 sections of the United States physiography.

Physiographic divisions

References